Ethmia melanocrates is a moth in the family Depressariidae. It is found in Kenya.

References

Endemic moths of Kenya
Moths described in 1923
melanocrates
Moths of Africa